Richard Crane may refer to:
Richard Crane (actor) (1918–1969), American character actor
Richard T. Crane (1832–1912), founder of R.T. Crane & Bro., a Chicago-based manufacturer
Richard Teller Crane II, United States diplomat
H. Richard Crane (1907–2007), American physicist
Sir Richard Crane, 1st Baronet (died 1645), of the Crane baronets

See also
Charles Richard Crane (1858–1939), American businessman
Crane (surname)
Castle Hill (Ipswich, Massachusetts), an estate owned by Richard Teller Crane Jr.